Cleusonite is a member of the crichtonite group of minerals with the chemical formula .  This group of minerals contains approximately thirteen complex metal titanates. The structures of minerals of this group is complicated by frequent fine-scale twinning and metamictization due to radioactive elements. The crichtonite group consists of members of related mineral species of the type A{BC2D6E12}O38 which are characterized by their predominant cations (as seen in crichtonite (Sr), senaite (Pb), davidite (REE + U), landauite (Na), loveringite (Ca), lindsleyite (Ba), and mathiasite (K).

Composition 

The following minerals are also found in the veins of cleusonite; quartz, chlorite, calcite, albite, microcline, tourmaline, fluorapatite, zircon, ilmenite, hematite, titanite, pyrite, chalcopyrite, tennantite, rutile, crichtonite, monazite-(Ce), and native gold.

Clausthalite, chalcopyrite, and uraninite are also found in the form of inclusions in cleusonite.

Structure 

The structure of the lead end-member senaite of the crichtonite group was determined in 1976 by Grey & Lloyd. The structure of the other members of the crichtonite group is similar and corresponds to the formula AM21O38. 

The crystals of cleusonite consist of multiple rhombohedra and hexagonal prisms that are twinned. The crystal system is a trigonal - rhombohedral class 3 and has space group of R.

Physical properties 
Cleusonite is seen as a black opaque cm-sized tabular crystal with a bright sub-metallic luster. It does not have any cleavage and has a density of about 4.74(4) g/cm3. The calculated density may vary from 5.02(6) (for untreated crystals) to 5.27(5) (heat-treated crystals); the variations are caused by the cell swelling due to the metamictization.

Cleusonite crystals are usually metamict black semimetallic prismatic and associated with quartz.

Geological occurrence characteristics  
It was found at two occurrences in greenschist facies metamorphosed gneissic series of the Mont Fort and Siviez-Mischabel Nappes in Valais, Switzerland (Cleuson and Bella Tolla summit), and named after the type locality. Cleusonite is found first in metamorphic rocks of the central Swiss Alps with the type locality being Oligocene-Miocene alpine cleft veins near Cleuson, Val de Nendaz, Valais and secondly in gneisses and crosscutting alpine veins near the Bella Tolla summit, also in Valais. In the Bella Tolla summit it is found in the form of hematite-stained flattened aggregates with quartz, albite, baryte, chalcopyrite, uraninite, tennantite, pyrite, magnetite, cinnabar, and malachite. The name cleusonite is used for the previously described “uranium-rich senaite” from Alinci, North Macedonia and the "plumbodavidite" from Huanglongpu, China. Cleusonite is radioactive.

References 

 Ercit, S.T et al. (2006). New mineral names. American Mineralogist, 2006; 91; 1201.120.‘Cleusonite Gallery’. (n.d). Retrieved on October 12th, 2009. from http://www.mindat.org/gallery.php?min=26262
 Gatehouse, B. M, Grey, I. E, Campbell, I. H & Kelly, P. R. (1978). The crystal structure of loveringite - a new member of the crichtonite group. American Mineralogist, 1978; 63: 28-36.
 General Cleusonite Information (n.d). Retrieved on October 12th, 2009 from: http://webmineral.com/data/Cleusonite.shtml 
 Haggerty, S.E et al. (1983). Lindsleyite (Ba) and mathiasite (K): Two new chromium-titanates in the crichtonite series from the upper mantle. American Mineralogist, 1983; 68:494-505.
 Pabst, A. (1961). X-ray crystallography of davidite. American Mineralogist, 1961; 46: 700-718.
 Sabau, G & Alberico, A. (2007). What is CCZN-armalcolite? A crystal-chemical discussion and an ad hoc incursion in the crichtonite-minerals group. Studia Universitatis Babeş-Bolyai, Geologia, 2007; 52 (2); 55-66.
 Wülser, P.A et al. (2005). Cleusonite, (Pb, Sr)(U4+,U6+)(Fe2+,Zn)2(Ti,Fe2+,Fe3+)18(O,OH)38, a new mineral species of the crichtonite group from the western Swiss Alps. European Journal of Mineralogy, 17(6), 933-942 (10). 
 Grey, I.E, Lloyd, D.J & White, J.S. Jr. (1976). The structure of crichtonite and its relationship to senaite. American Mineralogist, 1976; 61: 1203-1212

Lead minerals
Strontium minerals
Uranium(IV,VI) minerals
Iron(II,III) minerals
Zinc minerals
Titanium minerals
Oxide minerals
Trigonal minerals
Minerals in space group 148
Minerals described in 2005